Jack Edward Biggs (21 March 1922 – 8 December 1972) was a speedway rider from Australia.

Speedway career 
Biggs was a leading speedway rider in the 1950s. He reached the final of the Speedway World Championship on four occasions including finishing third in 1951 Individual Speedway World Championship.

He won four medals at the Australian Championship and he rode in the top tier of British Speedway from 1947–1970, riding for various clubs.

He was killed during a track accident on 8 December 1972 at Bendigo's Golden City Speedway.

World Final Appearances

Individual World Championship
 1950 –  London, Wembley Stadium – 15th – 3pts
 1951 –  London, Wembley Stadium – 3rd  – 12pts + 1pt
 1953 –  London, Wembley Stadium – 16th – 2pts
 1954 –  London, Wembley Stadium – 9th – 6pts
 1957 –  London, Wembley Stadium – Reserve – Did not ride

References 

1922 births
1972 deaths
Australian speedway riders
Harringay Racers riders
Oxford Cheetahs riders
Bradford Tudors riders
West Ham Hammers riders
Poole Pirates riders
Ipswich Witches riders
Coventry Bees riders
Newport Wasps riders
Cradley Heathens riders
Hackney Hawks riders
Motorcycle racers who died while racing
Sport deaths in Australia
Accidental deaths in Victoria (Australia)